Tafhim-ul-Quran is a 6-volume translation and commentary of the Qur'an by the Pakistani Islamist ideologue and activist Syed Abul Ala Maududi. Maududi began writing the book in 1942 and completed it in 1972.

Tafhim is derived from the Arabic word fahm which means "understanding". Tafhim-ul-Quran is a combination of orthodox and modernist interpretation and has deeply influenced modern Islamic thought. It differs from traditional exegeses in several ways. It is more than a traditional commentary on the scripture as it contains discussions and debates regarding economics, sociology, history, and politics. In his text, Maududi highlights Quranic perspective and argues that Islam provides ample guidance in all spheres.

Maududi uses the standard technique of providing an explanation of the Qur'anic verses from the Sunnah of Muhammad, including the historical reasons behind the verses.

The Tafhim deals extensively with issues faced by the modern world in general and the Muslim community in particular.

Maududi wrote his work in Urdu. It has since been translated to languages including English, Hindi, Bengali, Malayalam, Marathi, Pashto and Sindhi. In 2006, the Islamic Foundation published an abridged one-volume English translation by Zafar Ishaq Ansari under the title Towards Understanding the Qur'an.

References

External links
2006 English translation by Zafar Ishaq Ansari
Original Urdu text
Quran - Tafheem Maududi - Arabic English by QuranAlMajid.com

Tafsir works
Books by Sayyid Abul Ala Maududi
Sunni tafsir